NDL is a three letter acronym that may stand for:

Sports
 National Disability League, a multi-display sports tournament
 National Dodgeball League, U.S.
 National Development League, British third tier speedway league

Transportation
 Nandyal railway station, Andhra Pradesh, India
 Needles (Amtrak station), Needles, California, USA
 North Dulwich railway station, London, England
 N'Délé Airport (IATA: NDL), Central African Republic

Other uses
 Ndl (trigraph), used in the Romanized Popular Alphabet to write Hmong
 Collège Notre-Dame-de-Lourdes, Longueuil, Quebec, Canada
 Ndolo dialect (ISO 639:ndl), a Bantu language spoken in the Democratic Republic of the Congo
 National Diet Library, the national library of Japan
 No Decompression Limit, the time interval that a scuba diver may theoretically spend at a given depth without having to perform any decompression stops
 Norddeutscher Lloyd (1858–1970), a German steamship company
 Norwegian Defence League, (politics, Norway) a Norwegian offshoot of the European Defence League

See also
 NDLS (disambiguation)